Credo is a novel by British author and broadcaster Melvyn Bragg, published in 1996. A story of the Christian faith set in 7th-century Britain, it centers on the life of a young Celtic Princess torn between her dedication to God's service and her love for Padric, a Prince of Rheged. Set against the background of venerated Church figures of the period, notably St Cuthbert, St Wilfrid and Hilda of Whitby , Bega (i.e. St Bee) experiences all the violence and deprivations of her age.

It appeared in the USA with the title The Sword and the Miracle.

References 
Amazon Books

Books by Melvyn Bragg
1996 British novels
Fiction set in the 7th century
Sceptre (imprint) books